Animal Justice is a Canadian nonprofit organization with three main areas of focus: lobbying for stronger animal protection laws, improved enforcement of those laws, and fighting for animals in court.

It is Canada’s only national organization dedicated to advancing the interests of animals in the law. The organization makes submissions in court to obtain  intervenor status and provide the perspective of animals. The organization was founded in 2008 and is led by animal rights lawyer Camille Labchuk.

Cases and campaigns

Papanack Park Zoo investigation
In 2017, Animal Justice released undercover footage taken by a whistleblower who worked on the grounds of Papanack Park Zoo near Ottawa, Ontario. The zoo was investigated but no charges were laid.

Ban on bestiality
In 2016, Animal Justice was the first animal advocacy group to make oral arguments as an intervener in a Supreme Court of Canada case in order to provide context to the Court's assessment. The case identified a loophole that most sexual abuse of animals in Canada was not illegal. Following the case, Animal Justice campaigned for Bill C-84, which closed the loophole and banned all forms on bestiality in Canada.

Ban on whale and dolphin captivity
Animal Justice supported the passage of Bill S-203 that phases out the practice of keeping cetaceans in captivity in Canada and prohibits breeding of cetaceans and collecting reproductive materials from them.

Ban on shark fin imports
Animal Justice supported the passage of Bill C-68, banning shark finning in Canadian waters and the import and export of shark fins.

Paragon pig farm investigation
In 2020, W5 (TV program) aired Animal Justice’s undercover investigation showing alleged abuse at a pig farm in Puntam, Ontario.

Cedar Valley organic dairy farm investigation
In 2021, Animal Justice released an undercover video showing allegations of animal abuse at an organic dairy farm in Abbotsford, BC. The footage prompted an investigation from British Columbia Society for the Prevention of Cruelty to Animals and the farm had its licence suspended.

Ag gag lawsuit
In 2021, Animal Justice filed a constitutional challenge to anti-whistleblower laws in Ontario that would make it illegal for journalists and animal advocates to go undercover on farms to expose animal cruelty, known as “ag gag” laws. The organization is arguing that the Ontario law violates Canadians’ right to freedom of expression.

Canadian Animal Law Conference
The organization has held an annual national animal law conference since 2019. Philosopher Peter Singer was the keynote speaker at the first conference in 2019. The 2022 Canadian Animal Law Conference had 200 attendees and discussed legal developments furthering animal rights in Canada.

See also
Animal welfare and rights in Canada
List of animal rights groups

References

External links

Canadian Animal Law Conference

Animal law organizations
Animal rights organizations
Animal welfare organizations based in Canada